Mycobacterium fluoranthenivorans is a species of the phylum Actinomycetota (gram-positive bacteria with high guanine and cytosine content, one of the dominant phyla of all bacteria), belonging to the genus Mycobacterium.

Etymology: fluoranthenivorans, digesting fluoranthene.

Type strain
First isolated from contaminated soil of a former coal gas plant.
Strain FA4 = DSM 44556 = CIP 108203.

References

Hormisch et al. 2004.  Mycobacterium fluoranthenivorans sp. nov., a fluoranthene and aflatoxin B1 degrading bacterium from contaminated soil of a former coal gas plant. Syst. Appl. Microbiol.,

External links
Type strain of Mycobacterium fluoranthenivorans at BacDive -  the Bacterial Diversity Metadatabase

Acid-fast bacilli
fluoranthenivorans
Bacteria described in 2006